Mamta Kharb (born 26 January 1982, Sonipat, Haryana) is the former captain of the Indian women's hockey team.
During the 2002 Commonwealth Games, she scored the winning goal which gave India the Gold.  She also served as the model for the character of Komal Chautala in the 2007 Bollywood hit, Chak De India.Now she is working in Haryana police as a Deputy Supritendent of Police. She is a recipient of the Arjuna Award.

Known as 'golden girl' of Indian women hockey team, Mamta Kharb was born on 26 January 1982. She was declared the best player and the best scorer in the Junior Asia Cup hockey tournament held in Malayasia, where India won the bronze medal. She has also played a leading role in India's victory in the Common Wealth Games held in Manchester in 2002.

She scored the Golden Goal in the final against England in which India won the gold medal after 32 years.

Mamta's native village is Giwana in Sonipat district of Haryana. She did her schooling from Senior Secondary School Rohtak, Haryana. Her parents Kamla and Haripal reside in Model Town area, Rohtak.

Mamta's two sisters Poonam and Sushma have also played hockey at the national level. Sushma like Mamta, is still playing for the Railways.

Mamta's father Haripal Singh is a primary teacher and is posted in the village Bidhlan of the Sonipat district.

Born in a lower-middle-class family where her school teacher father had six other children to feed, Mamta Kharab's rise is an example of the struggle that women in Haryana have to make to realise their sporting ambitions

Ms. Mamta Kharb is a graduate from MD University, Rohtak. She has played a number of National and International Hockey matches/championships for India. Her sports achievements as per certificate given by Indian Women's Hockey Federation are as under:-

1999 National (U-21) Tournament, New Jersey, USA, 1st Place.

2000 Olympic Qualifying Tournament, Milton Keynes, England

2000 3rd Junior Asia Cup, Kuala Lumpur, Malaysia, Bronze Medal

2000 U-18 AHF Cup, Hong Kong, China, Gold Medal

2001 Test Matches in Australia

2001 4th Junior World Cup, Buenos Aires, Argentina

2001 10th Women's World Cup Qualification Tournament, France

2002 1st Championship Challenge Trophy, Johannesburg, South Africa, Bronze Medal

2002 4-Nations hockey Tournament, Manchester (England) 2nd place

2002 10th Women's World Cup Qualifying play off matches in England against USA

2002 17th Commonwealth Games, Manchester, England, Gold Medal

2004 5th Asia Cup, New Delhi, Gold Medal

2004 Test Matches in New Zealand

2005 Training-cum-competition, Adelaide, Australia, 1 March to 2 April 2005

2005 5th KT Cup International Tournament, Seongnam, Korea, 7–17 June 2005

2005 4 Nation Tournament, New Delhi 1–8 October 2005 Silver Medal

2005 7th Indira Gandhi International Gold Cup Women's Hockey Tournament, New Delhi 1–8 October 2005 Silver Medal

2006 18th Commonwealth Games, Melbourne, Australia, Silver Medal

Moreover, she was declared Best Player of the Tournament and Best Scorer of the Tournament in the Junior Asia Cup, in Malaysia in 2000. Above all, keeping in view her best performance in hockey, the Haryana Government decorated her with prestigious awards: "Bhim Award" and Government of India with "Arjun Award" in 2003.

Mamta Kharb is a young, dynamic and versatile hockey player who is leading the Indian Women Hockey Team. As is evident from her sports achievements mentioned above, she played a number of matches and won bronze, silver and gold medals and was decorated with prestigious Bhim and Arjun Awards.

In view of above, she has been appointed as P/DSP by the State Government.  She has joined on 5 October 2007 and has been further deputed for her Basic Training at Haryana Police Academy, Madhuban.

References

External links
Biography
Commonwealth Games Biography

Indian female field hockey players
Living people
1982 births
Recipients of the Arjuna Award
Field hockey players at the 2002 Commonwealth Games
Field hockey players at the 2006 Commonwealth Games
Commonwealth Games gold medallists for India
Commonwealth Games silver medallists for India
Sportswomen from Haryana
Field hockey players from Haryana
Asian Games medalists in field hockey
Field hockey players at the 2002 Asian Games
Field hockey players at the 2006 Asian Games
Asian Games bronze medalists for India
Commonwealth Games medallists in field hockey
21st-century Indian women
21st-century Indian people
Medalists at the 2006 Asian Games
Medallists at the 2002 Commonwealth Games
Medallists at the 2006 Commonwealth Games